Anthony "Tony" Cook (born 18 September 1936) is an Australian former long-distance runner who competed in the 1964 Summer Olympics. He also competed at the 1962 and 1966 British Empire and Commonwealth Games.

References

External links
 
 
 
 
 

1936 births
Living people
Australian male long-distance runners
Olympic athletes of Australia
Athletes (track and field) at the 1964 Summer Olympics
Commonwealth Games competitors for Australia
Athletes (track and field) at the 1962 British Empire and Commonwealth Games
Athletes (track and field) at the 1966 British Empire and Commonwealth Games
20th-century Australian people
21st-century Australian people